Murat Gürbüzerol (born 1 February 1988) is a Turkish footballer who plays as a right winger for Kuşadasıspor.

External links

1988 births
People from Söke
Living people
Turkish footballers
Association football wingers
Manisaspor footballers
Eyüpspor footballers
1922 Konyaspor footballers
Akhisarspor footballers
Balıkesirspor footballers
Boluspor footballers
Samsunspor footballers
Büyükşehir Belediye Erzurumspor footballers
Giresunspor footballers
Utaş Uşakspor footballers
Sarıyer S.K. footballers
Süper Lig players
TFF First League players
TFF Second League players
TFF Third League players